Middle Chuangxin Road  is a station on Line 2 of the Shanghai Metro, located in Tang Town, Pudong.

References

Shanghai Metro stations in Pudong
Railway stations in China opened in 2010
Line 2, Shanghai Metro
Railway stations in Shanghai